Moreton cum Alcumlow is a small civil parish in the unitary authority of Cheshire East and the ceremonial county of Cheshire, England. In the census of 2001 it was recorded as having a population of 150. The civil parish holds a parish council meeting under a grouping scheme with the adjacent 
civil parish of Newbold Astbury, and so it is consequently called Newbold Astbury-cum-Moreton Parish Council. Within the civil parish is the small village of Ackers Crossing, and Alcumlow Hall and Great Moreton Hall (Little Moreton Hall is in the adjacent civil parish of Odd Rode).

See also

Listed buildings in Moreton cum Alcumlow

References

External links

Villages in Cheshire
Civil parishes in Cheshire